Rajarajeshwari Nagar Assembly constituency, also known as RR Nagar, is one of the 224 constituencies in the Karnataka Legislative Assembly of the State of Karnataka, India. It is located within the Bangalore Rural Lok Sabha constituency.

Members of Vidhan Sabha
 2004 : Seat did not exist
 2008: M. Srinivas, Bharatiya Janata party 
 2013:  Munirathna Naidu, Indian National Congress
 2018: Munirathna, Indian National Congress (Joined BJP in November 2019)
 2020 (by-poll) : Munirathna (BJP)

Election Results

2020 Assembly Bypoll

2018 Assembly Elections

2008 Assembly Elections
 M. Srinivas (BJP): 60,187 votes
 P.N. Krishnamurthy (INC): 40595

See also
 Bangalore Urban district
 List of constituencies of Karnataka Legislative Assembly

References

Assembly constituencies of Karnataka
Bangalore Urban district